Advaita Vedānta is the oldest extant tradition of Vedānta, and one of the six orthodox (āstika) Hindu philosophies. Its history may be traced back to the start of the Common Era, but takes clear shape in the 6th-7th century CE, with the seminal works of Gaudapada, Maṇḍana Miśra, and Shankara, who is considered by tradition and Orientalist Indologists to be the most prominent exponent of the Advaita Vedānta, though the historical fame and cultural influence of Shankara grew only centuries later, particularly during the era of the Muslim invasions and consequent reign of the Indian subcontinent. The living Advaita Vedānta tradition in medieval times was influenced by, and incorporated elements from, the yogic tradition and texts like the Yoga Vasistha and the Bhagavata Purana. In the 19th century, due to the interplay between western views and Indian nationalism, Advaita came to be regarded as the paradigmatic example of Hindu spirituality, despite the numerical dominance of theistic Bkakti-oriented religiosity. In modern times, its views appear in various Neo-Vedānta movements.

Historiography
The historiography of Advaita Vedanta is coloured by Orientalist notions, while modern formulations of Advaita Vedānta, which developed as a reaction to western Orientalism and Perennialism have "become a dominant force in Indian intellectual thought."

In the Orientalist view, the medieval Muslim period was a time of stagnation and cultural degeneration, in which the original purity of the Upanisadic teachings, systematized by philosophers like Shankara, was lost. In this view, "the genuine achievements of Indian civilization" were recovered during the British colonial rule of India, due to the efforts of western Indologists, who viewed Advaita Vedanta as the authentic philosophy of the Upanishads, and Shankara as its greatest exponent. While this view has been criticised by postcolonial studies and critiques of Orientalism, "in some corners of the academy, the Orientalists' understanding of premodern Indian history has so far escaped thorough reexamination." According to Michael S. Allen and Anand Venkatkrishnan, "scholars have yet to provide even a rudimentary, let alone comprehensive account of the history of Advaita Vedānta in the centuries leading up to the colonial period."

Early Vedanta
The Upanishads form the basic texts, of which Vedānta gives an interpretation. The Upanishads do not contain "a rigorous philosophical inquiry identifying the doctrines and formulating the supporting arguments". This philosophical inquiry was performed by the darsanas, the various philosophical schools.

The Brahma Sutras of Bādarāyana, also called the Vedānta Sutra, were compiled in its present form around 400–450 AD, but "the great part of the Sutra must have been in existence much earlier than that". Estimates of the date of Bādarāyana's lifetime differ between 200 BC and 200 AD. The Brahma Sutra is a critical study of the teachings of the Upanishads, possibly "written from a Bhedābheda Vedāntic viewpoint." It was and is a guide-book for the great teachers of the Vedantic systems. Bādarāyana was not the first person to systematise the teachings of the Upanishads. He refers to seven Vedantic teachers before him:

Early Advaita Vedānta
Of the Vedānta-school before the composition of the Brahma Sutras (400–450 CE), wrote Nakamura in 1950, almost nothing is known. The two Advaita writings predating Maṇḍana Miśra and Shankara that were known to scholars such as Nakamura in the first half of 20th-century, were the Vākyapadīya, written by Bhartṛhari (second half 5th century,) and the Māndūkya-kārikā written by Gauḍapāda (7th century). Later scholarship added the Sannyasa Upanishads to the earliest known corpus.

According to Nakamura, "there must have been an enormous number of other writings turned out in this period [between the Brahma Sutras and Shankara], but unfortunately all of them have been scattered or lost and have not come down to us today". In his commentaries, Shankara mentions 99 different predecessors of his Sampradaya. In the beginning of his commentary on the Brhadaranyaka Upanishad Shankara salutes the teachers of the Brahmavidya Sampradaya. Pre-Shankara doctrines and sayings can be traced in the works of the later schools, which does give insight into the development of early Vedānta philosophy.

The names of various important early Vedānta thinkers have been listed in the Siddhitraya by Yamunācārya (c.1050), the Vedārthasamgraha by Rāmānuja (c.1050–1157), and the Yatīndramatadīpikā by Śrīnivāsa-dāsa. Combined, at least fourteen thinkers are known to have existed between the composition of the Brahman Sutras and Shankara's lifetime, namely Bhartŗhari (c.450–500), Upavarsa (c.450–500), Bodhāyana (c.500), Tanka (Brahmānandin) (c.500–550), Dravida (c.550), Bhartŗprapañca (c.550), Śabarasvāmin (c.550), Bhartŗmitra (c.550–600), Śrivatsānka (c.600), Sundarapāndya (c.600), Brahmadatta (c.600–700), Gaudapada (c.640–690), Govinda (c.670–720), Mandanamiśra (c.670–750).

Sannyasa Upanishads
Scholarship after 1950 suggests that almost all Sannyasa Upanishads, which belong to the minor Upanishads and are of a later date than the major Upanishads, namely the first centuries CE, and some of which are of a sectarian nature, have a strong Advaita Vedānta outlook. The Advaita Vedānta views in these ancient texts may be, states Patrick Olivelle, because major Hindu monasteries of this period (early medieval period, starting mid 6th century) belonged to the Advaita Vedānta tradition, preserving only Advaita views, and recasting other texts into Advaita texts.

Bhartṛhari
Bhartṛhari (also romanised as Bhartrihari; fl. c. 5th century CE) is a Sanskrit writer to whom are normally ascribed two influential Sanskrit texts:
 the Vākyapadīya, on Sanskrit grammar and linguistic philosophy, a foundational text in the Indian grammatical tradition, explaining numerous theories on the word and on the sentence, including theories which came to be known under the name of Sphoṭa; in this work Bhartrhari also discussed logical problems such as the liar paradox and a paradox of unnameability or unsignifiability which has become known as Bhartrhari's paradox, and 
 the Śatakatraya, a work of Sanskrit poetry, comprising three collections of about 100 stanzas each; it may or may not be by the same author who composed the two mentioned grammatical works.

Gauḍapāda and  

Gauḍapāda (6th century) was the teacher of Govinda Bhagavatpada and the grandteacher of Shankara. Gauḍapāda uses the concepts of Ajātivāda and Maya to establish "that from the level of ultimate truth the world is a cosmic illusion," and "suggests that the whole of our waking experience is exactly the same as an illusory and insubstantial dream." In contrast, Adi Shankara insists upon a distinction between waking experience and dreams.

Mandukya Karika
The  is a commentary in verse form on the Māṇḍūkya Upanishad, one of the shortest Upanishads consisting of just 13 prose sentences. Of the ancient literature related to Advaita Vedānta, the oldest surviving complete text is the Māṇḍukya Kārikā. Many other texts with the same type of teachings and which were older than Māṇḍukya Kārikā existed and this is unquestionable because other scholars and their views are cited by Gauḍapāda, Shankara and Anandagiri, according to Hajime Nakamura. Gauḍapāda relied particularly on the Māṇḍūkya Upanishad, as well as the Brihadaranyaka and Chandogya Upanishads.

Gaudapada took over the Yogachara teaching of vijñapti-mātra, "representation-only," which states that the empirical reality that we experience is a fabrication of the mind, experienced by consciousness-an-sich, and the four-cornered negation, which negates any positive predicates of 'the Absolute'. Gaudapada "wove [both doctrines] into the philosophy of Mandukaya Upanisad, which was further developed by Shankara". In this view,
 According to Bhattacharya, Asparsayoga also has Buddhist origins.

The Māṇḍūkya Upanishad was considered to be a Śruti before the era of Adi Shankara, but not treated as particularly important. In later post-Shankara period its value became far more important, and regarded as expressing the essence of the Upanishad philosophy. The entire Karika became a key text for the Advaita school in this later era.

Shri Gauḍapādacharya Math 

It is located in Kavale, Ponda, Goa, and is the oldest matha of the South Indian Saraswat Brahmins.

Early medieval period - Maṇḍana Miśra and Adi Shankara 
While today Shankara is regarded as the greatest exponent of Advaita Vedanta, until the 10th century his older contemporary Maṇḍana Miśra was the most prominent Advaitin. Shankara gained more attention in the 10th century, due to the writings of Vachaspati Misra (800–900 CE), a student of Maṇḍana Miśra, but it was not until the 14th century that Shankara was promoted as a folk-hero who disseminated Advaita Vedanta throughout India.

Historical context

Maṇḍana Miśra and Shankara lived in the time of the so-called "Late classical Hinduism", which lasted from 650 to 1100. This era was one of political instability that followed Gupta dynasty and King Harsha of the 7thcentury. It was a time of social and cultural change as the ideas of Buddhism, Jainism, and various traditions within Hinduism were competing for members. Buddhism in particular influenced India's spiritual traditions in the first 700 years of the 1st millennium AD. Shankara and his contemporaries made a significant contribution in understanding Buddhism and the ancient Vedic traditions; they then incorporated the extant ideas, particularly reforming the Vedānta tradition of Hinduism, making it India's most important tradition for more than a thousand years.

Maṇḍana Miśra 

Maṇḍana Miśra was an older contemporary of Shankara. Maṇḍana Miśra was a Mimamsa scholar and a follower of Kumarila, but also wrote a seminal text on Advaita that has survived into the modern era, the Brahma-siddhi. His influence was such that some regard the Brahma-siddhi to have "set forth a non-Shankaran brand of Advaita," and for a couple of centuries he seems to have been regarded as "the most important representative of the Advaita position." The "theory of error" set forth in this work became the normative Advaita Vedānta theory of error. According to Maṇḍana Miśra, errors are opportunities because they "lead to truth", and full correct knowledge requires that not only should one understand the truth but also examine and understand errors as well as what is not truth.

Maṇḍana Miśra's influence is reflected in a tradition which tells Maṇḍana Miśra and his wife were defeated by Shankara in a debate, after which he became a follower of Shankara. Yet, his attitude toward Shankara was that of a "self-confident rival teacher of Advaita," and the legend may have intended to incorporate Maṇḍana Miśra into Shankara's fold.

Adi Shankara

Systematizer of Advaita Vedanta thought
According to Nakamura, comparison of the known teachings of the early Vedantins and Shankara's thought shows that most of the characteristics of Shankara's thought "were advocated by someone before Śankara". Shankara "was the person who synthesized the Advaita-vāda which had previously existed before him". In this synthesis, he was the rejuvenator and defender of ancient learning. He was an unequalled commentator, due to whose efforts and contributions the Advaita Vedānta assumed a dominant position within Indian philosophy.

According to Mayeda, Shankara represents a turning point in the development of Vedānta, yet he also notices that it is only since Deussens's praise that Shankara "has usually been regarded as the greatest philosopher of India." Mayeda further notes that Shankara was primarily concerned with moksha, "and not with the establishment of a complete system of philosophy or theology," following Potter, who qualifies Shankara as a "speculative philosopher." According to Nakamura, after the growing influence of Buddhism on Vedānta, culminating in the works of Gauḍapāda, Adi Shankara gave a Vedantic character to the Buddhistic elements in these works, synthesising and rejuvenating the doctrine of Advaita. According to Koller, using ideas in ancient Indian texts, Shankara systematized the foundation for Advaita Vedānta in the 8th century, reforming Badarayana's Vedānta tradition.

Writings

Adi Shankara is best known for his reviews and commentaries (Bhasyas) on ancient Indian texts. Shankara's masterpiece of commentary is the Brahmasutrabhasya (literally, commentary on Brahma Sutra), a fundamental text of the Vedānta school of Hinduism. His commentaries on ten Mukhya (principal) Upanishads are also considered authentic by scholars. Other authentic works of Shankara include commentaries on the Bhagavad Gitā (part of his Prasthana Trayi Bhasya).

Shankara's Vivarana (tertiary notes) on the commentary by Vedavyasa on Yogasutras as well as those on Apastamba Dharma-sũtras (Adhyatama-patala-bhasya) are accepted by scholars as authentic works of Adi Shankara. Among the Stotra (poetic works), the Daksinamurti Stotra, Bhajagovinda Stotra, Sivanandalahari, Carpata-panjarika, Visnu-satpadi, Harimide, Dasa-shloki, and Krishna-staka are likely to be authentic. He also authored Upadesasahasri, his most important original philosophical work. Of other original Prakaranas (प्रकरण, monographs, treatise), 76 works are attributed to Adi Shankara. Modern era Indian scholars Belvalkar and Upadhyaya accept five and thirty nine works, respectively, as authentic.

Several commentaries on Nrisimha-Purvatatapaniya and Shveshvatara Upanishads have been attributed to Adi Shankara, but their authenticity is highly doubtful. Similarly, commentaries on several early and later Upanishads attributed to Shankara are rejected by scholars as his works, and are likely works of later Advaita Vedānta scholars; these include the Kaushitaki Upanishad, Maitri Upanishad, Kaivalya Upanishad, Paramahamsa Upanishad, Sakatayana Upanishad, Mandala Brahmana Upanishad, Maha Narayana Upanishad, and Gopalatapaniya Upanishad.

The authenticity of Shankara being the author of  has been questioned, and "modern scholars tend to reject its authenticity as a work by Shankara." The authorship of Shankara of his Mandukya Upanishad Bhasya and his supplementary commentary on Gaudapada's  has been disputed by Nakamura. However, other scholars state that the commentary on Mandukya, which is actually a commentary on Madukya-Karikas by Gaudapada, may be authentic.

Influence of Shankara
Shankara's status in the tradition of Advaita Vedānta is unparallelled. According to his hagiographies, written in te 14th-17th century and which shaped the popular reception of Shankara, he travelled all over India to help restore the study of the Vedas. His teachings and the tradition attributed to him form the basis of Smartism and have influenced Sant Mat lineages. He's further believed to have introduced the  form of worship, the simultaneous worship of five deitiesGanesha, Surya, Vishnu, Shiva, and Devi. Shankara explained that all deities were but different forms of the one Brahman, the invisible Supreme Being.

Benedict Ashley credits Adi Shankara for unifying two seemingly disparate philosophical doctrines in Hinduism, namely Atman and Brahman. Isaeva states that Shankara's influence extended to reforming Hinduism, founding monasteries, edifying disciples, disputing opponents, and engaging in philosophic activity that, in the eyes of Indian tradition, helped revive "the orthodox idea of the unity of all beings" and Vedānta thought.

Scholars have questioned Shankara's early influence in India. The historical records for this period are unclear, and little reliable information is known about the various contemporaries and disciples of Shankara. According to King and Roodurmun, until the 10th century Shankara was overshadowed by his older contemporary Mandana-Misra, who was considered to be the major representative of Advaita. Some modern Advaitins argue that most of post-Shankara Advaita vedanta actually deviates from Shankara, and that only his student Suresvara, who's had little influence, represents Shankara correctly. In this view, Shankara's influential student Padmapada misunderstood Shankara, while his views were manitained by the Suresvara school. According to Satchidanandendra Sarasvati, "almost all the later Advaitins were influenced by Mandana Misra and Bhaskara."

Until the 11th century, Vedanta itself was a peripheral school of thought; Vedanta became a major influence when Vedanta philosophy was utilized by various sects of Hinduism to ground their doctrines, such as Ramanuja (11th c.), who aligned bhakti, "the major force in the religions of Hinduism," with philosophical thought, meanwhile rejecting Shankara's views.

Several scholars argue that the historical fame and cultural influence of Shankara grew centuries later, particularly during the era of the Muslim invasions and consequent devastation of India. Many of Shankara's biographies were created and published in and after the 14th century, such as the widely cited Vidyaranya's Śankara-vijaya. Vidyaranya, also known as Madhava, who was the 12th Jagadguru of the Śringeri Śarada Pītham from 1380 to 1386, inspired the re-creation of the Hindu Vijayanagara Empire of South India in response to the devastation caused by the Islamic Delhi Sultanate. He and his brothers, suggest Paul Hacker and other scholars, wrote about Śankara as well as extensive Advaitic commentaries on the Vedas and Dharma. Vidyaranya was a minister in the Vijayanagara Empire and enjoyed royal support, and his sponsorship and methodical efforts helped establish Shankara as a rallying symbol of values, spread historical and cultural influence of Shankara's Vedānta philosophies, and establish monasteries (mathas) to expand the cultural influence of Shankara and Advaita Vedānta.

Advaita Vedānta sub-schools
After Maṇḍana Miśra and Shankara, several sub-schools developed. Two of them still exist today, the Bhāmatī and the Vivarana. Two defunct schools are the Pancapadika and Istasiddhi, which were replaced by Prakasatman's Vivarana school. These schools worked out the logical implications of various Advaita doctrines. Two of the problems they encountered were the further interpretations of the concepts of māyā and avidya.

Sureśvara 
Sureśvara (fl. 800–900 CE) was a contemporary of Shankara. Sureśvara has been credited as the founder of a pre-Shankara branch of Advaita Vedānta, and is often (incorrectly) being identified with Maṇḍana Miśra. The identification is unlikely, and may reflect the influence of Mandana Misra. Hiriyanna and Kuppuswami Sastra have pointed out that Sureśvara and Maṇḍana Miśra had different views on various doctrinal points:
 The locus of avidya: according to Maṇḍana Miśra, the individual jiva is the locus of avidya, whereas Suresvara contends that the avidya regarding Brahman is located in Brahman. These two different stances are also reflected in the opposing positions of the Bhamati school and the Vivarana school.
 Liberation: according to Maṇḍana Miśra, the knowledge that arises from the Mahavakya is insufficient for liberation. Only the direct realization of Brahma is liberating, which can only be attained by meditation. According to Suresvara, this knowledge is directly liberating, while meditation is at best a useful aid.

Padmapada – Pancapadika school
Padmapada (c. 800 CE) was a direct disciple of Shankara who wrote the Pancapadika, a commentary on the Sankara-bhaya. Padmapada diverged from Shankara in his description of avidya, designating prakrti as avidya or ajnana.

Vachaspati Misra – Bhamati school

Vachaspati Misra (800–900 CE), a student of Maṇḍana Miśra, wrote the Brahmatattva-samiksa, a commentary on Maṇḍana Miśra's Brahma-siddhi, wrote the Bhamati, a commentary on Shankara's Brahma Sutra Bhashya, and the Brahmatattva-samiksa, a commentary on Mandana Mishra's Brahma-siddhi. His thought was mainly inspired by Mandana Miśra, and harmonises Shankara's thought with that of Mandana Miśra. According to Advaita tradition, Shankara reincarnated as Vachaspati Miśra "to popularise the Advaita System through his Bhamati." Only two works are known of Vachaspati Misra, the Brahmatattva-samiksa on Maṇḍana Miśra's Brahma-siddhi, and his Bhamati on the Sankara-bhasya, Shankara's commentary on the Brahma-sutras. The name of the Bhamati sub-school is derived from this Bhamati.

The Bhamati school takes an ontological approach. It sees the Jiva as the source of avidya. It sees meditation as the main factor in the acquirement of liberation, while the study of the Vedas and reflection are additional factors.

Vimuktatman – Ista-Siddhi
Vimuktatman (c. 1200 CE) wrote the Ista-siddhi. It is one of the four traditional siddhi, together with Mandana's Brahma-siddhi, Suresvara's Naiskarmya-siddhi, and Madusudana's Advaita-siddhi. According to Vimuktatman, absolute Reality is "pure intuitive consciousness". His school of thought was eventually replaced by Prakasatman's Vivarana school.

Prakasatman – Vivarana school

Prakasatman (c. 1200–1300) wrote the Pancapadika-Vivarana, a commentary on the Pancapadika by Padmapadacharya. The Vivarana lends its name to the subsequent school. According to Roodurmum, "[H]is line of thought [...] became the leitmotif of all subsequent developments in the evolution of the Advaita tradition."

The Vivarana school takes an epistemological approach. Prakasatman was the first to propound the theory of mulavidya or maya as being of "positive beginningless nature", and sees Brahman as the source of avidya. Critics object that Brahman is pure consciousness, so it cannot be the source of avidya. Another problem is that contradictory qualities, namely knowledge and ignorance, are attributed to Brahman.

Late medieval times – "yogic Advaita" and "Greater Advaita Vedānta"
Michael S. Allen and Anand Venkatkrishnan note that Shankara is very well-studied, but "scholars have yet to provide even a rudimentary, let alone comprehensive account of the history of Advaita Vedānta in the centuries leading up to the colonial period."

Prominent teachers

According to Sangeetha Menon, prominent names in the later Advaita tradition are:
 Prakāsātman, Vimuktātman, Sarvajñātman (10th century)(see above)
 Śrī Harṣa, Citsukha (12th century)
 ānandagiri, Amalānandā (13th century)
 Vidyāraņya, Śaṅkarānandā (14th century)
 Sadānandā (15th century)
 Prakāṣānanda, Nṛsiṁhāśrama (16th century)
 Madhusūdhana Sarasvati, Dharmarāja Advarindra, Appaya Dīkśita (17th century)

Vaishnavite Vedanta (10th-14th century)
Hajime Nakamura notes that the early Vedanta scholars were from the upper classes of society, well-educated in traditional culture. They formed a social elite, "sharply distinguished from the general practitioners and theologians of Hinduism." Their teachings were "transmitted among a small number of selected intellectuals". Works of the early Vedanta schools do not contain references to Vishnu or Shiva. It was only after Shankara that "the theologians of the various sects of Hinduism utilized Vedanta philosophy to a greater or lesser degree to form the basis of their doctrines," whereby "its theoretical influence upon the whole of Indian society became final and definitive."

Influence of yogic tradition
While indologists like Paul Hacker and Wilhelm Halbfass took Shankara's system as the measure for an "orthodox" Advaita Vedānta, the living Advaita Vedānta tradition in medieval times was influenced by, and incorporated elements from, the yogic tradition and texts like the Yoga Vasistha and the Bhagavata Purana. The Yoga Vasistha became an authoritative source text in the Advaita vedānta tradition in the 14th century, while the "yogic Advaita" of Vidyāraņya's Jivanmuktiviveka (14th century) was influenced by the (Laghu-)Yoga-Vasistha, which in turn was influenced by Kashmir Shaivism. Vivekananda's 19th century emphasis on nirvikalpa samadhi was preceded by medieval yogic influences on Advaita Vedānta. In the 16th and 17th centuries, some Nath and hatha yoga texts also came within the scope of the developing Advaita Vedānta tradition.

Development of central position (14th century)

In medieval times, Advaita Vedanta position as most influential Hindu darsana started to take shape, as Advaitins in the Vijayanagara Empire competed for patronage from the royal court, and tried to convert others to their sect. It is only during this period that the historical fame and cultural influence of Shankara and Advaita Vedanta was established. Many of Shankara's biographies were created and published in and after the 14th century, such as Vidyaranya's widely cited Śankara-vijaya. Vidyaranya, also known as Madhava, who was the 12th Jagadguru of the Śringeri Śarada Pītham from 1380 to 1386 and a minister in the Vijayanagara Empire, inspired the re-creation of the Hindu Vijayanagara Empire of South India. This may have been in response to the devastation caused by the Islamic Delhi Sultanate,  but his efforts were also targeted at Srivaisnava groups, especially Visistadvaita, which was dominant in territories conquered by the Vijayanagara Empire. Furthermore, sects competed for patronage from the royal court, and tried to convert others to their own sectarian system. Vidyaranya and his brothers, note Paul Hacker and other scholars, wrote extensive Advaitic commentaries on the Vedas and Dharma to make "the authoritative literature of the Aryan religion" more accessible. Vidyaranya was an influential Advaitin, and he created legends to turn Shankara, whose elevated philosophy had no appeal to gain widespread popularity, into a "divine folk-hero who spread his teaching through his digvijaya ("universal conquest") all over India like a victorious conqueror." In his doxography Sarvadarśanasaṅgraha ("Summary of all views") Vidyaranya presented Shankara's teachings as the summit of all darsanas, presenting the other darsanas as partial truths which converged in Shankara's teachings, which was regarded to be the most inclusive system. The Vaishanava traditions of Dvaita and Visitadvaita were not classified as Vedanta, and placed just above Buddhism and Jainism, reflecting the threat they posed for Vidyaranya's Advaita allegiance. Bhedabheda wasn't mentioned at all, "literally written out of the history of Indian philosophy." Such was the influence of the Sarvadarśanasaṅgraha, that early Indologists also regarded Advaita Vedanta as the most accurate interpretation of the Upanishads. And Vidyaranya founded a matha, proclaiming that it was established by Shankara himself. Vidyaranya enjoyed royal support, and his sponsorship and methodical efforts helped establish Shankara as a rallying symbol of values, spread historical and cultural influence of Shankara's Vedānta philosophies, and establish monasteries (mathas) to expand the cultural influence of Shankara and Advaita Vedānta.

It is with the arrival of Islamic rule, first in the form of Delhi Sultanate and later the Mughal Empire, and the subsequent persecution of Indian religions, that Hindu scholars began a self-conscious attempts to define an identity and unity. Between the twelfth and the fourteenth century, according to Andrew Nicholson, this effort emerged with a classification of astika and nastika systems of Indian philosophies. Certain thinkers, according to Nicholson, began to retrospectively classify ancient thought into "six systems" (saddarsana) of mainstream Hindu philosophy.

Traditional Hindus present an alternate thesis. The scriptures such as the Vedas, Upanishads and Bhagavad Gitā, texts such as Dharmasutras and Puranas, and various ideas that are considered to be paradigmatic Hinduism are traceable to being thousands of years old. Unlike Christianity and Islam, Hinduism as a religion does not have a single founder, rather it is a fusion of diverse scholarship where a galaxy of thinkers openly challenged each other's teachings and offered their own ideas. The term "Hindu," states Arvind Sharma, appears in much older texts such as those in Arabic that record the Islamic invasion or regional rule of the Indian subcontinent. Some of these texts have been dated to between the 8th and the 11th century.

Modern times (colonial rule and independence)

Neo-Vedanta

King states that its present position was a response of Hindu intellectuals to centuries of Christian polemic aimed at establishing a "Hindu inferiority complex" during the colonial rule of the Indian subcontinent. The "humanistic, inclusivist" formulation, now called Neo-Vedānta, attempted to respond to this colonial stereotyping of "Indian culture was backward, superstitious and inferior to the West", states King. Advaita Vedānta was projected as the central philosophy of Hinduism, and Neo-Vedānta subsumed and incorporated Buddhist ideas thereby making the Buddha a part of the Vedānta tradition, all in an attempt to reposition the history of Indian culture. Thus, states King, neo-Vedānta developed as a reaction to western Orientalism and Perennialism. With the efforts of Vivekananda, modern formulations of Advaita Vedānta have "become a dominant force in Indian intellectual thought", though Hindu beliefs and practices are diverse.

According to King, with the consolidation of the British imperialist rule the new rulers started to view Indians through the "colonially crafted lenses" of Orientalism. In response Hindu nationalism emerged, striving for socio-political independence and countering the influence of Christian missionaries. In this colonial era search of identity Vedānta came to be regarded, both by westerners as by Indian nationalists, as the essence of Hinduism, and Advaita Vedānta came to be regarded as "then paradigmatic example of the mystical nature of the Hindu religion" and umbrella of "inclusivism". This view on Advaita Vedānta, according to King, "provided an opportunity for the construction of a nationalist ideology that could unite Hindus in their struggle against colonial oppression".

Among the colonial era intelligentsia, according to Anshuman Mondal, a professor of Literature specializing in post-colonial studies, the monistic Advaita Vedānta has been a major ideological force for Hindu nationalism. Mahatma Gandhi professed monism of Advaita Vedānta, though at times he also spoke with terms from mind-body dualism schools of Hinduism. Other colonial era Indian thinkers, such as Vivekananda, presented Advaita Vedānta as an inclusive universal religion, a spirituality that in part helped organize a religiously infused identity, and the rise of Hindu nationalism as a counter weight to Islam-infused Muslim communitarian organizations such as the Muslim League, to Christianity-infused colonial orientalism and to religious persecution of those belonging to Indian religions.

Swami Vivekananda

A major proponent in the popularisation of this Universalist and Perennialist interpretation of Advaita Vedānta was Swami Vivekananda, who played a major role in the revival of Hinduism, and the spread of Advaita Vedānta to the west via the Ramakrishna Mission. His interpretation of Advaita Vedānta has been called "Neo-Vedānta". Vivekananda discerned a universal religion, regarding all the apparent differences between various traditions as various manifestations of one truth. He presented karma, bhakti, jnana and raja yoga as equal means to attain moksha, to present Vedānta as a liberal and universal religion, in contrast to the exclusivism of other religions.

Vivekananda emphasised nirvikalpa samadhi as the spiritual goal of Vedānta, he equated it to the liberation in Yoga and encouraged Yoga practice he called Raja yoga. This approach, however, is missing in historic Advaita texts. In 1896, Vivekananda claimed that Advaita appeals to modern scientists:

According to Rambachan, Vivekananda interprets anubhava as to mean "personal experience", akin to religious experience, whereas Shankara used the term to denote liberating understanding of the sruti.

Vivekananda's claims about spirituality as "science" and modern, according to David Miller, may be questioned by well informed scientists, but it drew attention for being very different than how Christianity and Islam were being viewed by scientists and sociologists of his era.

Sarvepalli Radhakrishnan

Sarvepalli Radhakrishnan, first a professor at Oxford University and later a President of India, further popularized Advaita Vedānta, presenting it as the essence of Hinduism. According to Michael Hawley, a professor of Religious Studies, Radhakrishnan saw other religions, as well as "what Radhakrishnan understands as lower forms of Hinduism," as interpretations of Advaita Vedānta, thereby "in a sense Hindusizing all religions". To him, the world faces a religious problem, where there is unreflective dogmatism and exclusivism, creating a need for "experiential religion" and "inclusivism". Advaita Vedānta, claimed Radhakrishnan, best exemplifies a Hindu philosophical, theological, and literary tradition that fulfills this need. Radhakrishnan did not emphasize the differences between Buddhism, Jainism, Sikhism versus Hinduism that he defined in terms of Advaita Vedānta, rather he tended to minimize their differences. This is apparent, for example, in his discussions of Buddhist "Madhyamika and Yogacara" traditions versus the Advaita Vedānta tradition.

Radhakrishnan metaphysics was grounded in Advaita Vedānta, but he reinterpreted Advaita Vedānta for contemporary needs and context. He acknowledged the reality and diversity of the world of experience, which he saw as grounded in and supported by the transcendent metaphysical absolute concept (nirguna Brahman). Radhakrishnan also reinterpreted Shankara's notion of maya. According to Radhakrishnan, maya is not a strict absolute idealism, but "a subjective misperception of the world as ultimately real."

Mahatama Gandhi
Gandhi declared his allegiance to Advaita Vedānta, and was another popularizing force for its ideas. According to Nicholas Gier, this to Gandhi meant the unity of God and humans, that all beings have the same one Self and therefore equality, that atman exists and is same as everything in the universe, ahimsa (non-violence) is the very nature of this atman. Gandhi called himself advaitist many times, including his letters, but he believed that others have a right to a viewpoint different than his own because they come from a different background and perspective. According to Gier, Gandhi did not interpret maya as illusion, but accepted that "personal theism" leading to "impersonal monism" as two tiers of religiosity.

Contemporary Advaita Vedānta
Contemporary teachers are the orthodox Jagadguru of Sringeri Sharada Peetham; the more traditional teachers Sivananda Saraswati (1887–1963), Chinmayananda Saraswati (1916-1993), Dayananda Saraswati (Arsha Vidya) (1930-2015), Swami Paramarthananda, Swami Tattvavidananda Sarasvati, Carol Whitfield (Radha), Sri Vasudevacharya (previously Michael Comans)  and less traditional teachers such as Narayana Guru. According to Sangeetha Menon, prominent names in 20th century Advaita tradition are Shri Chandrashekhara Bharati Mahaswami, Chandrasekharendra Saraswati Swamigal, Sacchidānandendra Saraswati.

Influence on New religious movements

Neo-Advaita

Neo-Advaita is a New Religious Movement based on a popularised, western interpretation of Advaita Vedānta and the teachings of Ramana Maharshi. Neo-Advaita is being criticised for discarding the traditional prerequisites of knowledge of the scriptures and "renunciation as necessary preparation for the path of jnana-yoga". Notable neo-advaita teachers are H. W. L. Poonja, his students Gangaji Andrew Cohen, and Eckhart Tolle.

Non-dualism

Advaita Vedānta has gained attention in western spirituality and New Age, where various traditions are seen as driven by the same non-dual experience. Nonduality points to "a primordial, natural awareness without subject or object". It is also used to refer to interconnectedness, "the sense that all things are interconnected and not separate, while at the same time all things retain their individuality".

See also
 History of India
 History of Hinduism
 History of Buddhism
 Buddhist influences on Advaita Vedanta

Notes

References

Sources
Printed sources

Web-sources

Further reading
 
 
 T. M. P. Mahadevan, Preceptors of Advaita, 1968

External links
 Bibliography of Advaita Vedānta Ancient to 9th-century literature
 Bibliography of Advaita Vedānta 9th-century to 20th-century literature

Advaita Vedanta